The list of shipwrecks in June 1826 includes some ships sunk, wrecked or otherwise lost during June 1826.

1 June

2 June

3 June

4 June

6 June

7 June

12 June

13 June

14 June

15 June

16 June

17 June

20 June

22 June

24 June

26 June

28 June

29 June

30 June

Unknown date

References

1826-06